This is a list of incidents involving Indonesian airline Garuda Indonesia. The airline suffered 49 incidents.

Fatal accidents
17 November 1950
Douglas C-47A PK-DPB overran the runway on landing at Juanda Airport and crashed into a ditch, killing two of 23 on board.

24 December 1959
Flight 330, a Douglas C-47A (PK-GDV) en route to Pangkal Pinang from Palembang, crashed in a swamp near Palembang while returning to the airport following engine failure, killing one of four crew. The pilot had descended too low in poor weather; the aircraft may also have been slightly overloaded.

24 January 1961
Flight 424, a Douglas C-47A (PK-GDI), disappeared while on a Jakarta-Bandung passenger service with 21 onboard; the wreckage was found four days later on the slope of Mount Burangrang with no survivors. The cause was blamed on pilot error.

3 February 1961
Flight 542, a Douglas C-47A (PK-GDY), disappeared over the Java Sea off Madura Island on a Surabaya–Balikpapan service with 26 on board; the wreckage has never been found.

20 September 1963
Scottish Aviation Twin Pioneer Series 1 PK-GTB crashed in Indonesia, killing seven.

1 January 1966
Douglas C-47As PK-GDE and PK-GDU collided in mid-air near Palembang while on approach to Palembang Airport, Indonesia, probably due to crew errors; both aircraft crashed in a swamp, killing all 34 on board both aircraft.

16 February 1967
Flight 708, a Lockheed L-188C Electra, crashed on landing at Manado due to pilot error in bad weather, killing 22 of 92 on board.

28 May 1968
Flight 892, a Convair 990A, crashed minutes after takeoff from Bombay–Santacruz Airport, killing all 29 people on board. In addition, there was also one fatality on the ground.

26 September 1972
Fokker F27-600 PK-GFP banked right and crashed after climbing to  following takeoff from Kemayoran Airport, Jakarta during a training flight, killing the three crew.

7 September 1974
Fokker F27-600 PK-GFJ struck buildings while on approach to Branti Airport, killing 33 of 36 people on board.

4 December 1974
Martinair Flight 138 (PH-MBH) Leased to Garuda Indonesia for Hajj flight crashed in Colombo, Sri Lanka

24 September 1975
Flight 150, a Fokker F28-1000 (named Mahakem), crashed on approach to Sultan Mahmud Badaruddin II Airport. The accident, which was attributed to poor weather and fog, killed 25 out of 61 passengers and one person on the ground.

15 November 1978
Icelandic Airlines Flight 001 (TF-FLA) Leased to Garuda Indonesia for Hajj flight crashed in Colombo, Sri Lanka

6 March 1979
Flight 553, a Fokker F28-1000 (PK-GVP, named Sambas) struck Mount Bromo (near Probolinggo, East Java) while on a positioning flight from Denpasar to Surabaya, killing the four crew.

11 July 1979
Fokker F28-1000 PK-GVE Mamberamo struck Mount Sibayak on approach to Medan Airport, killing all 61 on board.

20 March 1982
Fokker F28-1000 PK-GVK overran the runway at Tanjung Karang-Branti Airport in bad weather. The aircraft subsequently burst into flames killing all 27 people on board.

2 June 1983
Fokker F28-3000RC PK-GFV Selegan overran the runway on takeoff from Branti Airport after failing to lift off as a result of crew error, killing three of 61 onboard.

4 April 1987
Flight 035, a McDonnell Douglas DC-9-32, hit a pylon and crashed on approach to Polonia International Airport in bad weather due to possible wind shear, killing 23 of 45 on board.

13 June 1996
Flight 865, a McDonnell Douglas DC-10-30, overran the runway at Fukuoka Airport, Japan after aborting takeoff well above rotation speed following an uncontained failure of engine three. Three of the 275 people on board were killed. The crash was blamed on pilot error and improper maintenance.

26 September 1997
Flight 152, an Airbus A300B4-220 flying from Jakarta to Medan, crashed in Sibolangit,  short of Medan Airport in low visibility, killing all 234 people on board. It is the deadliest aviation incident in Indonesia.

16 January 2002
Flight 421, a Boeing 737-3Q8 en route from Lombok to Yogyakarta was forced to make an emergency landing but finally crashed in poor weather on the Solo River, due to an engine flameout caused by water and hail ingestion. One person, a stewardess, was killed in the accident.

7 September 2004
Human rights activist Munir Said Thalib was murdered on Flight 974, bound for Amsterdam. Garuda's CEO at the time, Indra Setiawan, his deputy Rohainil Aini, and pilot Pollycarpus Priyanto were all convicted of his murder. Garuda was found negligent in failing to perform an emergency landing and was ordered to pay compensation to Munir's widow, but did not do so immediately.

7 March 2007
Flight 200, a Boeing 737-400 flying from Jakarta to Yogyakarta, overran the runway on landing at Adisutjipto International Airport, Yogyakarta. 21 people were killed when the aircraft burst into flames.

Non-fatal accidents
15 March 1952
Convair CV-240-23 PK-GCH collided in mid-air with Douglas C-47A PK-RCR in Indonesia; both aircraft landed safely with no casualties.

9 May 1952
Douglas DC-3C PK-DPA force-landed after takeoff from Ipoh, Malaysia; no casualties.

25 November 1954
Douglas C-47A PK-DPD overran the runway on landing at Jamba Airport due to pilot error; all 22 on board survived.

10 December 1958
de Havilland Heron 1B PK-GHP was written off at Jakarta; no casualties.

29 December 1961
Douglas C-47A PK-GDZ crashed near Surabaya.

27 February 1962
Convair CV-240-23 PK-GCB was written off at Palembang.

5 April 1962
Douglas C-47A PK-GDM burned out at Kemayoran Airport.

17 August 1962
Convair CV-240-23 PK-GCE was written off at Ambon.

4 May 1963
Scottish Aviation Twin Pioneer 3 PK-GTC was written off during takeoff from an unknown location.

13 January 1980
Douglas DC-9-32 PK-GND Brantas was written off following a heavy landing at Sjamsudin Noor Airport; all 126 on board survived.

11 June 1984
Douglas DC-9-32 PK-GNE was being ferried to Jakarta when it suffered fuselage failure after it bounced on landing; all five crew survived.

30 December 1984
Douglas DC-9-32 PK-GNI overran the runway on landing at Ngurah Rai Airport and broke in three after landing too late; all 75 on board survived.

29 March 1989
Fokker F28-4000 PK-GKD left the runway on landing at Tjilik Riwut Airport following left landing gear failure; all 66 on board survived. The aircraft was repaired and returned to service.

4 April 1990
Fokker F28-4000 PK-GKU suffered damage at Sepingan Airport after the right main landing wheel went into a ditch; all 61 on board survived. The aircraft was repaired and returned to service.

21 June 1993
Flight 630, a Douglas DC-9-32 (PK-GNT), landed hard at Ngurah Bai Airport due to pilot error, causing serious damage to the aircraft; all 79 on board survived.

8 July 1994 
Flight 156, a Boeing 737-4U3 (PK-GWK), landed hard in heavy rain at Polonia Airport, suffering serious damage; all 90 on board survived. The aircraft was repaired and returned to service.

8 April 1995
While on approach to London, Flight 976, a Boeing 747-2U3B (PK-GSE), suffered a failure of the forward flap section on the left hand inboard trailing edge flap, after which it hit the rear left fuselage behind a door; the approach was continued and the aircraft landed safely at London. The cause was traced back to improper assembly of the flap section.

15 September 1995
McDonnell Douglas MD-11 EI-CDJ suffered a sudden pitch up and down over the Atlantic Ocean near waypoint GURKA (215 km north of Tenerife); no casualties.

20 March 1997
Flight 980, a Boeing 747-2U3B (PK-GSA), overran the runway on landing at Chiang Kai Shek, blowing out some tires; all 301 on board survived. The aircraft was repaired and returned to service.

21 June 1997
Flight 800, a McDonnell Douglas MD-11 (EI-CDK), suffered a tailstrike during a go-around from an attempted autopilot autoland landing due to pilot error; all 308 on board survived. The aircraft was repaired and returned to service.

11 August 2003
Flight 073, a Fokker F28-3000R (PK-GFT), suffered left gear collapse while landing at Hatta International Airport; all 24 on board survived.

23 July 2008
Boeing 737-4M0 PK-GZN suffered a broken landing gear axle after landing at Sjamsudin Noor Airport; all 121 on board survived. The axle broke due to a fatigue crack from a rusted hole in the brake assembly attachment flange.

9 December 2010
While parked at Hatta International Airport, Boeing 737-4U3 PK-GWO was struck in the nose by a pushback tug; no casualties.

16 March 2013
While parked at Hatta International Airport, Boeing 737-5U3 PK-GGA was struck by a maintenance dock on the right side of the nose during a storm; no casualties. The 737 and a GECAS Airbus A320 (N620SC) were parked opposite hangar No. 3 when two maintenance docks were blown across the ramp, striking the aircraft; the 737 was written off. The accident was also reported to have occurred on March 15.

15 February 2015
Flight 7040, operated by ATR 72-600 PK-GAG, ran off the runway on landing at Lombok International Airport due to crew errors, all 34 on board survived.

1 February 2017
Flight 258, operated by Boeing 737-8U3 PK-GNK, overran the runway on landing at Adisutjipto Airport in heavy rain

Hijackings
5 September 1977
A McDonnell Douglas DC-9-32 was hijacked by one man who held a stewardess at gunpoint, but was then overpowered by the crew. The aircraft then landed at Surabaya where the hijacker was taken into custody but never revealed his motive behind the hijacking.

28 March 1981
Flight 206, operated by McDonnell Douglas DC-9-32 Woyla, was hijacked on a domestic flight from Palembang to Medan by five members of Komando Jihad. The hijackers demanded to be flown to Sri Lanka, but the aircraft did not have enough fuel and diverted to Penang to refuel, and then flew to Bangkok. The hijackers demanded the release of 84 political prisoners in Indonesia who were imprisoned following a terrorist attack on a police station. On the third day of the hijacking (31 March) was stormed by Indonesian Kopassus commandos, surprising the hijackers, who opened fire on the commandos. They returned fire, killing three hijackers. One of the commandos was shot, probably by his comrades, as was the pilot, also probably by Indonesian commandos. The rest of the hostages were released unharmed. Two of the hijackers surrendered to the Thai commandos, but were killed by Indonesian commandos on the plane taking them back to Jakarta.

26 May 1994
A Vietnamese asylum seeker returning to Vietnam from an Indonesian refugee camp attempted to hijack a Garuda charter flight from Indonesia to Australia. Shortly after takeoff from Batam, the man took out a gasoline-filled shampoo bottle and splashed gasoline near the cockpit door and threatened to light himself on fire unless the flight diverted to Australia. A Garuda mechanic and other asylum seekers overpowered the man and the flight continued to Vietnam, where the man was taken into custody upon arrival.

References

Notes 

Garuda Indonesia